The Seattle Marathon is an annual marathon held in Seattle, Washington, USA, around the last Sunday in November.  It was first held in 1970.

History 
It was organized by a group of friends from the University of Washington. A total of 38 runners participated, with 31 running the full distance.

The 2020 in-person edition of the race was cancelled due to the coronavirus pandemic. Entrants were given the option to defer their entry to 2021 or get refunded.

Course

Former course 

A former course began on 5th Avenue N. between Harrison and Mercer Streets in front of the Museum of Pop Culture on the eastern edge of the Seattle Center campus, followed 5th Avenue through Downtown and the International District to Interstate 90, followed I-90 across Lake Washington to Mercer Island, turned around and headed back across the Homer M. Hadley Memorial Bridge to the shoreline, followed Lake Washington Boulevard S. to Seward Park, looped Bailey Peninsula, and followed Lake Washington Boulevard S. back up the shoreline to McGilvra Boulevard E. in Madison Park. From there, the course followed E. Madison Street southwest to the southern entrance of the Washington Park Arboretum, turning north on Lake Washington Boulevard E. to E. Interlaken Boulevard. The course followed Interlaken northwest out of the Arboretum and through Interlaken Park, then west across Interstate 5 to Boylston Avenue E. Heading south, it followed Boylston back under the freeway, where it becomes Lakeview Boulevard E., then followed Lakeview south, once again over the interstate, to Eastlake Avenue E. The course turned west on Republican Street through Cascade to Dexter Avenue N., where it jogged north one block to Mercer Street, then turned south on 4th Avenue N. and finished within Memorial Stadium in Seattle Center.

Current course 

The marathon course begins on 5th Avenue N and Harrison Street near the Space Needle, and ends in the nearby Memorial Stadium.

The course first heads southwest into Downtown Seattle before heading north via Interstate 5 and crossing the Lake Washington Ship Canal via Ship Canal Bridge.  Runners then head up to NE 103rd Street (just past Matthews Beach Park) and back via the Burke-Gilman Trail.  The marathon continues west largely on the trail until hitting a turnaround point near 8th Avenue NW, and then heads back south across Lake Union via the Aurora Bridge to finish in Memorial Stadium.

Sponsorship 
The marathon is sponsored by Amica Insurance.

Seattle Quadzilla 
The Seattle Marathon is the last of a series of four marathons in four days referred to as the Seattle Quadzilla.  The race series also includes the Wattle Waddle Marathon on Thursday, the Wishbone Run on Friday, and the Seattle Ghost Marathon on Saturday.

There were 24 finishers in 2010, the first year the series was held.

Winners

Notes

References

Further reading 
 Joel Steven Rouse "It's tough, wet and has no prize money, but diehards love Seattle Marathon", Seattle Post Intelligencer, November 30, 2002
* Jon Naito, "Seattle Marathon will be missing a Steidl: Uli won't go for ninth win in a row", Seattle Post Intelligencer, November 23, 2007
 Perry, N., "Just 1% of Marathon money goes to charity", The Seattle Times, November 26, 2007.
 Jeff Graham, "Married couple wins Seattle Marathon",  Seattle Post Intelligencer, November 27, 2006
* David Andriesen, "This marathon is for Maniacs",  Seattle Post Intelligencer, November 24, 2006
* Ronald Tillery, "Race Moves Downtown", Seattle Post Intelligencer, November 28, 1998
* "Runners beating path to Seattle Marathon: Foreign contingent growing for Sunday's 30th annual race",  Seattle Post Intelligencer, November 25, 1999

External links

Marathons in the United States
Sports competitions in Seattle
Annual sporting events in the United States
Seattle Center
Recurring sporting events established in 1970
1970 establishments in Washington (state)